The 1937-38 French Rugby Union Championship was won by Perpignan that beat Biarritz in the final.

The tournament was played by 40 clubs divided in eight pools of five clubs.
At the second round were admitted the first two of each pool.

Context 

The 1938 International Championship was won by Scotland, the France was excluded.

France won the third FIRA Tournament in Bucharest.

Semifinals

Final

External links
 Compte rendu de la finale de 1938, sur lnr.fr

1938
France 1938
Championship